Bipradas Pal Chowdhury Institute of Technology, established in 1956,  is a government polytechnic institute located in Krishnanagar, Nadia district, West Bengal. This institute was named in the memory of landlord and Bengali industrialist Bipradas Pal Chowdhury. This institute is the pioneer of Diploma in Civil Engineering in the state of West Bengal as this was the first polytechnic institute to ever get a licence in Civil Engineering which is why it was often called LC(Licence in Civil Engineering) College. This polytechnic college is affiliated to the West Bengal State Council of Technical Education, and recognised by AICTE, New Delhi. This polytechnic offers diploma courses in Electrical, Computer Science & Technology, Mechanical and Civil Engineering.

References

External links
 Admission to Polytechnics in West Bengal for Academic Session 2006-2007
 http://bpcitkrishnagar.org/

Universities and colleges in Nadia district
Educational institutions established in 1956
1956 establishments in West Bengal
Technical universities and colleges in West Bengal
Krishnanagar